Antti Sami Aalto (born March 4, 1975) is a Finnish retired professional ice hockey player who played for the Mighty Ducks of Anaheim in the National Hockey League.

Playing career 
Aalto was drafted by the Mighty Ducks of Anaheim in the 1993 NHL Entry Draft in the 6th round, 134th overall. He continued to play in Finland for TPS until the 1997–98 season when he joined the Ducks. He was assigned to their minor hockey team, the Cincinnati Mighty Ducks for 29 games and played for the Ducks for three games. He continued to play in the NHL until the 2000–01 season. The next season, 2001–02, saw Aalto return to Finland, which is where he continued to play until 2006 when he was forced to retire due to a shoulder injury.

Career statistics

Regular season and playoffs

International

References
 

1975 births
Living people
Cincinnati Mighty Ducks players
Finnish expatriate ice hockey players in the United States
Finnish ice hockey centres
Ice hockey players at the 2002 Winter Olympics
Jokerit players
Anaheim Ducks draft picks
Mighty Ducks of Anaheim players
Olympic ice hockey players of Finland
People from Lappeenranta
HC TPS players
Sportspeople from South Karelia